Christophe Madihano (born 10 October 1995 in Goma) is a Congolese commercial photographer, author, film producer and illustrator whose work focuses on themes of Afrofuturism in culture, identity, and fictional narratives. He is one of the founders of Madi TV, an international entertainment pay television channel in Democratic Republic of the Congo.

Career 
Christophe Madihano was born on 10 October 1995, in Goma in the Democratic Republic of the Congo. He began his career in 2017 and attracted international attention with his project "The Kongo Kingdom", in which the Swedish-Congolese singer Mohombi appeared as one of the key figures of the Kongo Kingdom.

In 2020, Madihano became widely known through his project "The forgotten heroes". It's a gallery of images showing the Armed Forces of the Democratic Republic of Congo (FARDC) in action in the rain and in a dusty environment, supported by the government of the Democratic Republic of the Congo.

Works 

 2017 : The Kongo Kingdom
 2019 : The Forgotten Heroes
 2021 : Havila

References 

1995 births
Living people
Democratic Republic of the Congo photographers
Democratic Republic of the Congo documentary filmmakers
Democratic Republic of the Congo film directors
Democratic Republic of the Congo film producers
Democratic Republic of the Congo painters
Digital artists
People from Goma
People from Kinshasa
21st-century Democratic Republic of the Congo people
Afrofuturists
21st-century photographers
21st-century male artists